Lawrence Walters could refer to: 

Lawrence G. Walters (born 1963), American attorney and First Amendment activist
Lawrence Richard Walters (1949–1993), American truck driver known as "Lawnchair Larry", who devised a temporary aircraft using a lawnchair and helium balloons